Paul Edwards (born 22 February 1965) is an English former professional footballer who played as a goalkeeper.

Career
Born in Liverpool, Edwards began his career in non-League football with Leek Town, before playing in the Football League with Crewe Alexandra and Shrewsbury Town, making 341 League appearances between 1988 and 2001. Edwards later returned to non-League football with Telford United, and also played in Wales for Newtown.

References

1965 births
Living people
English footballers
Leek Town F.C. players
Crewe Alexandra F.C. players
Shrewsbury Town F.C. players
Telford United F.C. players
Newtown A.F.C. players
English Football League players
Association football goalkeepers